Annand is a surname of Scottish origin. Variant forms include Anand (although this is more commonly found as a name of Indian origin).

The roots of the name Annand are found among the Strathclyde-Briton people of the ancient Scottish Borderlands. Annand was originally found in Dumfriesshire.

Notable people with the surname Annand
Notable people with this surname include:
 Bud Annand, Australian rules footballer
 Douglas Annand, Australian graphic designer
 Eddie Annand, Scottish footballer
 Frederick Annand, Australian businessman
 James Annand, Scottish journalist
 James Douglas Annand, Australian politician
 J. K. Annand, a Scottish poet
 Louise Gibson Annand, Scottish painter and film-maker
 Richard Annand, English soldier
 Walter J. D. Annand, aeronautical academic
 William Annand, Canadian publisher and politician

References

Scottish surnames